is a Japanese pianist.

Trained at the Tōhō Gakuen Daigaku, she completed her studies at the Conservatoire de Paris, with teacher Gabriel Tacchino. Kameda won the 1981 Épinal International Piano Competition and placed second in the 1983 Cleveland International Piano Competition.

She remains internationally active as a concert pianist in a duo with Jean-Jacques Balet.

References

  National University of Colombia
 Epinal competition

Living people
Year of birth missing (living people)
Japanese classical pianists
Japanese women pianists
Women classical pianists
Classical piano duos
Cleveland International Piano Competition prize-winners
Toho Gakuen School of Music alumni
Conservatoire de Paris alumni
21st-century classical pianists
21st-century Japanese women musicians
21st-century women pianists